Karoceratidae is a family of nautiloids within the order Oncocerida, characterized by straight or curved, laterally narrow, shells and slender, ventral siphuncles that are empty except in Karoceras. Siphuncle segments are inflated ventrally but straight dorsally. Septal necks are cyrtochoanitic, outwardly curved; connecting rings are thin.

Genera include Karoceras, Osbornoceras, and possibly Shuranoceras, which have been found in sediments ranging from the Lower Silurian to possibly as young as the Lower Devonian.

References

 Walter C. Sweet, 1964. Nautiloidea - Oncocerida; Treatise on Invertebrate Paleontology, Part K. Geological Society of America and University of Kansas Press.

Prehistoric nautiloid families
Llandovery first appearances
Early Devonian extinctions
Oncocerida